Angelo Scola (born 7 November 1941) is an Italian Cardinal of the Catholic Church, philosopher and theologian. He was Archbishop of Milan from 2011 to 2017. He had served as Patriarch of Venice from 2002 to 2011. He has been a cardinal since 2003 and a bishop since 1991.

Biography

Early life
Scola was born in Malgrate, Milan, to Carlo Scola, a truck driver, and Regina Colombo. He was the younger of two sons; Pietro, his elder brother, died in 1983. He attended high school at the Manzoni Lyceum in Lecco, where he participated in the youth movement Gioventù Studentesca (Student Youth).

He studied philosophy at the Catholic University of the Sacred Heart from 1964 to 1967, obtaining his doctorate with a dissertation on Christian philosophy under the superivision of Gustavo Bontadini, master of Emanuele Severino. During this time served as vice-president and thereafter President of the Milanese diocesan chapter of the Federazione Universitaria Cattolica Italiana, the university student wing of Catholic Action.

At the university Scola met Luigi Giussani, the founder of the Catholic movement Communion and Liberation. After earning his degree in philosophy and teaching in high schools, Scola entered the Archiepiscopal seminary of Milan, studying one year in Saronno and the others in Venegono. In 1969 Scola was denied permission to be ordained subdeacon a year early. Following the advice of Luigi Giussani, in summer 1969 Scola moved to the seminary of the Diocese of Teramo-Atri where he studied one year. On 18 July 1970 Scola was ordained to the priesthood in Teramo by Bishop Abele Conigli.

He earned a second doctorate in theology from the University of Fribourg, Switzerland. He wrote his dissertation on St. Thomas Aquinas. An active collaborator in the Communion and Liberation movement from the early 1970s, Scola was the Italian editor of the journal Communio founded by Henri de Lubac, Hans Urs von Balthasar, and Joseph Ratzinger (later Pope Benedict XVI). He conducted book-length interviews with de Lubac and von Balthasar.

After studying in Munich and Paris and doing pastoral work, Scola returned to Fribourg to work as research assistant to the chair of political philosophy from 1979 and then Assistant Professor of Fundamental Moral Theology until 1982 when he was appointed Professor of Theological Anthropology at the Pontifical John Paul II Institute for Studies on Marriage and Family and Professor of Contemporary Christology at the Pontifical Lateran University.

From 1986 to 1991 Scola served as consultor to the Congregation for the Doctrine of the Faith. At the various institutes where he taught he promoted the establishment of bursaries to enable foreign students, particularly those from poorer countries, to study in Italy.

Bishop of Grosseto
Scola was named Bishop of Grosseto on 18 July 1991, and was consecrated by Cardinal Bernardin Gantin (with Bishops Abele Conigli and Adelmo Tacconi serving as co-consecrators) on the following 21 September. As Bishop of Grosseto he promoted a renewal of catechesis in the diocese. Scola chose as his episcopal motto Sufficit gratia tua ("Your grace suffices", 2 Corinthians 12:9).

Among Scola's chief pastoral concerns in Grosseto were the education of children and youths, vocations and clergy formation (he reopened the diocesan seminary), new approaches to parish life, the pastoral care of labourers (particularly during the difficult period of the dismantling of mines in Grosseto), culture and the family, and the opening of a diocesan mission in Santa Cruz, Bolivia. During this period he wrote and published a book aimed at young people on the subject of the educative mission of the Church. In his pastoral capacity as bishop, Scola paid particular attention to the issues of education, youth, clergy formation, renewal of parish life, pastoral care of workers, culture and the family.

Rector of Lateran University and offices in Roman Curia

Scola in 1995 resigned as bishop of Grosseto to serve as rector of the Pontifical Lateran University in Rome and President of the Pontifical John Paul II Institute for Studies on Marriage and Family in Rome, with a term spent as visiting professor at the counterpart Institute in Washington, D.C., during which time he wrote a monograph on the theology of von Balthasar.

In 1995 he became a member of the Congregation for the Clergy. He also served as member of the Episcopal Commission for Catholic Education of the Italian Bishops' Conference and, from 1996, as president of the Committee for Institutes of Religious Studies which addresses questions of the theological formation of the laity in Italy.

From 1996 to 2001 Scola was a member of the Pontifical Council for Health Workers and wrote several texts on issues around health care. In 1996 he was named a member to the Pontifical Council for the Family.

On 17 January 2009 he was appointed a member of the Pontifical Council for Culture by Pope Benedict. On 5 January 2011 he was appointed among the first members of the newly created Pontifical Council for the Promotion of the New Evangelisation. He is also a member of the Congregation for Divine Worship.

Patriarch of Venice

Scola was appointed Patriarch of Venice on 5 January 2002, elected President of the Bishops' Conference of the Triveneta region on 9 April 2002 and created Cardinal-Priest of Santi XII Apostoli on 21 October 2003. As Patriarch Scola developed a reputation of openness and pastoral concern. In Venice, for instance, he set aside Wednesday mornings to meet anyone who wanted to see him, whether or not they had an appointment.

In 2004, he founded the Studium Generale Marcianum, an academic institute, and the journal Oasis, published in Italian, English, French, Arabic and Urdu as an outreach to Christians in the Muslim world.

After the death of Pope John Paul II in 2005, Scola was considered to be among the papabili in the 2005 papal conclave that elected Joseph Ratzinger, Pope Benedict XVI.

Archbishop of Milan
On 28 June 2011 he was appointed to replace Cardinal Dionigi Tettamanzi as Archbishop of Milan. On 9 September 2011 he took possession of the Archdiocese of Milan by proxy. Scola received from Pope Benedict XVI the pallium of Metropolitan Archbishop of Milan on 21 September 2011 at Castel Gandolfo. On 25 September 2011 he was enthroned in Milan.

On 7 March 2012 he was appointed a member of the Congregation for the Oriental Churches. On 21 April he was appointed a member of the Congregation for the Doctrine of the Faith.

Scola knows Italian (as well as Lecchese dialect), English, German, French and a little Spanish.

In 2013, Scola again was a leading candidate to be elected pope—and the press service of the Italian Bishops' Conference mistakenly announced Scola's election—in the conclave that elected Cardinal Jorge Bergoglio, Pope Francis.

Pope Francis accepted Scola's resignation on 7 July 2017 and appointed Bishop Mario Delpini as his successor. In retirement, Scola planned to live in Imberido, a village near Lake Annone.

Views and theology

2014 and 2015 Synod of Bishops
In 2018, Scola expressed his opposition to Communion for the divorced and civilly remarried unless they live in complete continence, the possibility of which has been the focus of controversy surrounding Pope Francis's apostolic exhortation Amoris laetitia. Scola said withholding Communion is "not a punishment that can be taken away or reduced, but is inherent in the very character of Christian marriage".

Scola said in December 2014 that he had "discussed with Cardinals Marx, Daneels, and Schönborn in my 'minor circle' about the possible access to Communion for the divorced and remarried, but I cannot see how to combine on one side the indissolubility of the marriage, and on the other seeming to deny de facto the same principle". The cardinal suggested that the contradiction would result in "a separation between doctrine and pastoral care and discipline" which need to coexist in order to properly function. He said it was also difficult to raise the matter with younger couples suggesting that indissolubility becomes a watered down concept "if they know there will always be a possible exit".

The cardinal is adamant that even though there are problematic marital situations, "marriage is not in crisis today" because there will always be pastoral accompaniment as well as the need to acknowledge "the deep understanding of who humankind is" and how it reflects upon both the origin and importance of the marital sacrament.

Ecumenism
Scola supports stronger ecumenical ties between Catholicism and Islam "at a grassroots level" believing that there is much common ground between the two faiths, particularly, addressing persecution of Christian communities in the Middle East which Scola focuses on. The cardinal met with the Patriarch of Moscow Kirill on 12 November 2013, and previously said the meeting was not related in any way to the visit of President Vladimir Putin to Pope Francis at the Vatican.

Scola has said in the past that it is also his duty to connect with the Orthodox faithful living in his archdiocese, "giving them churches where they can celebrate the divine liturgy and our experience of a greatly fraternal relationship". The cardinal has also said that while doctrinal and theological differences may linger, it was essential to recognize and collaborate on tackling common issues "like the family, justice, life".

Second Vatican Council
In a 2012 conference, Scola refuted the idea of the Second Vatican Council being a battle of continuity versus discontinuity, suggesting instead that the documents that were promulgated during the Council only further enriched the Church by expanding upon previous magisterial teachings. Scola said that "there is no animosity between Vatican II as an event and as a body of documents, but rather conformity".

Tridentine Mass
Scola favors celebrating the Tridentine Mass and has defended Pope Benedict's 2007 authorization of its wider use alongside other conservative cardinals such as Camillo Ruini and Carlo Caffarra. In Padua in 2017, he issued a strong defense of the Mass and when he became archbishop of Milan immediately sought to reverse his predecessor's restrictions on its use. He took similar actions as patriarch of Venice.

Works
Scola is the author of numerous theological and pedagogical works on topics such as bio-medical ethics, theological anthropology, human sexuality and marriage and the family, which have been translated into several languages. In addition, he is the author of more than 120 articles published in scholarly journals of philosophy and theology.

Published works

Online texts
Which Foundation? (PDF file)
The Nuptial Mystery: A Perspective for Systematic Theology? (PDF file)
Christian Experience and Theology
Satanic Rites in the Church's Judgement

References

External links
 
 Official website
 
 International Journal Oasis

1941 births
Archbishops of Milan
Bishops of Grosseto
Cardinals created by Pope John Paul II
Communion and Liberation
21st-century Italian cardinals
Living people
Members of the Congregation for the Clergy
Members of the Congregation for the Doctrine of the Faith
Members of the Congregation for the Oriental Churches
Members of the Pontifical Council for Culture
Members of the Pontifical Council for the Promotion of the New Evangelisation
Patriarchs of Venice
People from the Province of Lecco
Università Cattolica del Sacro Cuore alumni
University of Fribourg alumni
20th-century Italian Roman Catholic bishops
21st-century Italian  Roman Catholic archbishops